The 2014–15 Saudi Professional League (known as the Abdul Latif Jameel Professional League for sponsorship reasons) was the 39th season of the Saudi Professional League, the top Saudi professional league for association football clubs, since its establishment in 1976. The season began on 8 August 2014 and ended on 18 May 2015. Al-Nassr were the defending champions having won their sixth title last season. The league was contested by the 12 teams from the 2013–14 season as well as Al-Khaleej and Hajer, who joined as the promoted clubs from the 2013–14 First Division. They replace Al-Ettifaq and Al-Nahda who were relegated to the 2014–15 First Division.

On 10 May, Al-Nassr secured their seventh league title and second one in a row with one game to spare after a 1–0 win against derby rivals Al-Hilal coupled with Al-Ahli's 2–2 draw with Al-Taawoun. Runners-up Al-Ahli ended the season without a single defeat becoming the third team to ever do so in a 26-game league season and the fourth team overall. They became the first team to end the season unbeaten and not be crowned champions.

Both Al-Orobah and Al-Shoulla were relegated on the final matchday on 10 May. Al-Orobah were relegated after a 1–0 home defeat to Najran. Al-Shoulla were relegated after a 2–2 draw with Al-Raed.

Teams
Fourteen teams competed in the league – the twelve teams from the previous season and the two teams promoted from the First Division. The promoted teams were Hajer (returning after a season's absence) and Al-Khaleej (returning to the top flight after seven years). They replaced Al-Ettifaq (ending their thirty-seven-year top-flight spell) and Al-Nahda (who were relegated after one season in the top flight).

Stadiums and locations

Note: Table lists in alphabetical order.

Personnel and kits 

 1 On the back of the strip.
 2 On the right sleeve of the strip.

Managerial changes

Foreign players
The number of foreign players is restricted to four per team, including a slot for a player from AFC countries.

Players name in bold indicates the player is registered during the mid-season transfer window.

 Orestes has East Timorese passport and was counted as Asian player.

League table

Results

Season progress

Season statistics

Scoring

Top scorers

Hat-tricks

Most assists

Clean sheets

Discipline

Player 
 Most yellow cards: 10
 Adnan Fallatah (Al-Taawoun)

 Most red cards: 2
 Khalid Al-Ghamdi (Al-Nassr)
 Sultan Al-Yami (Al-Orobah)
 Mohamed Husain (Al-Nassr)

Club 
 Most yellow cards: 63
 Najran

 Most red cards: 7
 Al-Shabab

Attendances

By round

By team

†
†

Awards
On 5 August 2014, the SAFF announced a new set of awards that included six categories. The winners were announced on 14 June 2015.

Player of the Year:  Mohammad Al-Sahlawi (Al-Nassr)
Young Player of the Year:  Abdulfattah Asiri (Al-Ittihad)
Goalkeeper of the Year:  Abdullah Al-Enezi (Al-Nassr)
Manager of the Year:  Christian Gross (Al-Ahli)
Top Scorer:  Omar Al Somah (Al-Ahli)
Perfect Team: Al-Ahli

See also 
 2014–15 Saudi First Division
 2015 King Cup
 2014–15 Crown Prince Cup
 2015 Super Cup

References

Saudi Professional League seasons
Saudi Professional League
Professional League